Luciana Reali (born 4 March 1936) is an Italian gymnast. She competed at the 1952 Summer Olympics and the 1956 Summer Olympics.

References

1936 births
Living people
Italian female artistic gymnasts
Olympic gymnasts of Italy
Gymnasts at the 1952 Summer Olympics
Gymnasts at the 1956 Summer Olympics
Place of birth missing (living people)